Suria Sabah is a shopping centre located in the city of Kota Kinabalu, Sabah, Malaysia. Completed in July 2009, the mall sits on an 11-acre site facing the South China Sea with a scenic view of the Tunku Abdul Rahman National Park.

See also
 List of shopping malls in Malaysia

References

External links

 

Shopping malls in Sabah